The Meteorological and Geophysical Bureau (SMG,) is a department of the Macao Government. It provides weather forecasts and issues warnings on weather-related hazards. It also provides geophysical-related services to meet the needs of the public and the shipping, aviation, industrial and engineering sectors.

Overview
The Meteorologic and Geophysic Services was established in 1952 as a government agency after taking over the role from the Portuguese Navy. Meteorological data had been recorded in Macau since 1861 with online data back to 1901. It was renamed the Meteorological and Geophysical Bureau following the handover in 1999.

Services

 Meteorological Monitoring
 Seismological Monitoring
 Climate & Atmospheric Environment
 Telecommunications & Processing

Buildings in the Observatory
The SMG's headquarters and observatory is located at Rampa do Observatório on Taipa Grande.

References

See also
Hong Kong rainstorm warning signals
Hong Kong tropical cyclone warning signals
China Meteorological Administration
Hong Kong Observatory
Central Weather Bureau (Taiwan)

1952 establishments in Macau
Government agencies established in 1952
Government departments and agencies of Macau
Governmental meteorological agencies in Asia